Lindstrøm Peak is a peak,  high, standing  northwest of Mount Kristensen on the west side of Nilsen Plateau, in the Queen Maud Mountains of Antarctica. It was named by the Advisory Committee on Antarctic Names for Adolf Lindstrøm, cook for the land party at Framheim on Amundsen's South Pole expedition of 1910–12. This naming preserves the spirit of Amundsen's commemoration of "Mount A. Lindstrom," a name applied in 1911 for an unidentifiable mountain in the general area.

References

Mountains of the Ross Dependency
Amundsen Coast